A Life of Grime (a play on the expression A Life of Crime) is a BBC reality series following the work of environmental health inspectors.  Launched during an explosion of reality television, the idea found something of a cult following.

Overview
With Louis Armstrong's "What a Wonderful World" as the title music, the episodes were narrated by John Peel and later by Arthur Smith in sardonic tones.  Its appeal was based on disgust and the eccentric but often vivid and eloquent characters, most famously Edmund Trebus, encountered either hoarding rubbish or keeping huge numbers of animals.  The original series was set in Haringey; subsequent series have been set in Bristol, Salford, Sheffield, Tower Hamlets, City of Westminster, New York and Edinburgh.

U.S. version
An American version of the series titled A Life of Grime New York, aired on the Discovery Times Channel that takes place in New York.

Syndication
Both A Life of Grime and A Life of Grime New York have been aired on UKTV People.

External links
 
 

1999 British television series debuts
2006 British television series endings
1990s British reality television series
2000s British reality television series
BBC Television shows
English-language television shows